MV Hansa Brandenburg was a 2002-built Liberian-flagged container ship operated by the German shipping company Leonhardt & Blumberg.

General characteristics 
Fully laden, she drew  of water. Her container capacity, measured in twenty-foot equivalent units (TEU), was 1,740. For loading and unloading, she had two 40-ton cranes. Hansa Brandenburg was served by a crew of 17.

Hansa Brandenburg was propelled by a single MAN B&W 7S60MC-C low-speed crosshead diesel engine manufactured under licence in China. For maneuvering at ports, Hansa Brandenburg had a 900kW bow thruster.

Career 
Hansa Brandenburg was built in 2002 by Guangzhou Wenchong Shipyard in Guangzhou, People's Republic of China. She was known as Maersk Auckland in 2003–2007 and Tiger Jade in 2007–2011 before reverting to her former name.

2013 fire 
On July 15, 2013, one of the containers onboard Hansa Brandenburg caught fire while the ship was en route from Singapore to Durban. The crew was rescued by another container ship, . By July 18, a salvage tug had arrived at the scene and on the following day it was reported that the fire had been brought under control.

On July 22, it was announced the ship was under tow and a final decision on the port of refuge was yet to be made. Further assessment of damage to the vessel would follow upon arrival. The vessel was eventually towed to Port Louis, Mauritius.

According to NGO Shipbreaking Platform, Hansa Brandenburg was sold for scrapping in Southeast Asia, likely India.

The Hansa Brandenburg fire was the second serious accident involving a container ship in the Indian Ocean during the summer of 2013. A salvage was attempted on the bow section, but on July 6 a fire broke out and it sank four days later.

References 

Maritime incidents in 2013
Container ships
2002 ships
Merchant ships of Liberia
Ships built in China